This is a list of Nirvana in Fire episodes. The series originally aired in 2 episodes daily on Beijing TV and Dragon TV, Monday through Sunday from 19:30 to 21:00. It premiered on September 19, 2015, and aired its finale on October 15, 2015. Nirvana in Fire tells the story of Lin Shu, or his alias Mei Changsu, who stirs the political pot in Jin Ling, with an ultimate goal to bring justice to his family and 70,000 Chiyan soldiers who were labeled traitors twelve years before.

Note: For viewer ratings, the number on top is the audience share on Dragon TV, while the number in the bottom is of Beijing TV.

Episodes

Ep 1-10

Ep 11-20

Ep 21-30

Ep 31-40

Ep 41-50

Ep 51-54

References

External links 

Lists of Chinese drama television series episodes
Episodes
Television episodes set in China